Jim Castillo Phillips is an American certified broadcast meteorologist at KSDK 5 On Your Side in St. Louis, Missouri.

Castillo previously worked at WNYW in New York City, KCBS and KTLA in Los Angeles, and WTXF in Philadelphia. He also spent time in Seattle; first as chief meteorologist at KCPQ in Seattle and later a meteorologist at KOMO.

He also worked on film and television projects, including the CBS drama Criminal Minds and the BBC America series Torchwood: Miracle Day. While working full-time in television news, Castillo also acted in movies Leap of Faith, Blink, With Honors, and Duplex.

In 2015, he left KTLA to get married and moved to northern Indiana where he became a commercial real estate broker. In January 2020, he moved with his family back to his hometown of St. Louis.

He is a SAG-AFTRA vested member and has been certified by the American Meteorological Society with the CBM Seal of Approval.

Education and career

Castillo attended the University of Missouri in Columbia, Missouri on a leadership and academic scholarship and received his bachelor's degree, with honors, in Atmospheric Science. While in college, he was secretary of the Meteorology Club, a member of the Delta Tau Delta fraternity, and a cheerleader.

Castillo grew up loving sports, including soccer, gymnastics, diving, pole vaulting and scuba diving. His passion for weather sparked after a F-3 tornado struck his neighborhood and made national news on April 7, 1980. "I just wanted to know how and why it happened...And how do I help people so this doesn't happen to them?"  

While in college, he interned for the National Weather Service in Jefferson City, Missouri.  He also interned in the weather department at KOMU, an NBC Network affiliate in Columbia, Missouri, eventually leading to his first on-air position as a weather anchor and host of a weekly exercise show.

Castillo's career began as a storm chaser across the Midwest and Texas, earning a storm chasing card from the National Weather Service. He was the first meteorologist on "Good Day Philadelphia" at WTXF, the Fox Network station in Philadelphia, Pennsylvania, where he also hosted segments and conducted man-on-the-street interviews.

After nearly two years, he was offered his first chief meteorologist position at KCPQ, the Nexstar Media Group-owned station in Seattle, Washington. While at the station, he won his first individual Northwest Emmy Award for Best Weather in the Pacific Northwest in 1999.

In 2001, Castillo joined the CBS Network affiliate KCBS in Los Angeles, California as the chief meteorologist working on the 5, 6 and 11 p.m. newscasts.  In September 2002, Castillo accepted an offer at WNYW Fox 5 in New York City as the evening meteorologist. He continued working at the station for more than three years.

From January 2006 until August 2009, Castillo worked as the morning meteorologist at KOMO in Seattle, Washington.

In June 2010, Castillo joined the weekend team as the first weekend meteorologist at KTLA, the oldest television station in Los Angeles, California. He also anchored the weather on the 1 p.m. and 3 p.m. weekly newscasts.

Castillo married his partner in July 2015 and moved back to the Midwest where both were both raised. He worked as a commercial real estate broker at NAI Hanning & Bean in Fort Wayne, Indiana for several years before returning into television.

In January 2020, Castillo joined KSDK as a meteorologist, working on the 4 p.m., 5 p.m., 6 p.m. and 10 p.m. shows on Fridays, 5 p.m., 6 p.m., and 10 p.m. shows on Saturdays, and the 5 p.m. newscasts Tuesdays through Thursdays.

Filmography

Jim Castillo has acted in several roles in film and television over the past two decades. His credits include:

2014: Million Dollar Arm (film) (Walt Disney Pictures)
2011: Criminal Minds (CBS Productions)
2011: Torchwood: Miracle Day (BBC America/Starz)
2010: Photo Booth(Short) (No Slack Productions)
2003: Duplex (Miramax Films)
1994: With Honors (Warner Bros.)
1994: Blink (New Line Cinemas)
1992: Leap of Faith (Paramount Pictures)

Awards

2015: KTLA-TV - Commemorative Emmy Award, Winner, KTLA’s Season of Sharing: Help for the Philippines)
2008: KOMO-TV - Emmy Award, Winner, Morning Newscast (11 a.m.)
2008: KOMO-TV - Emmy Award, Nominee, Morning Newscast (11 a.m.)
2008: KOMO-TV - Emmy Award, Nominee, Morning Newscast (11 a.m.)
2008: KOMO-TV - RTNDA Edward R. Murrow Award, Winner, Overall Excellence (Television: Large Market)
2007: KOMO-TV - Emmy Award, Winner, Morning Newscast (11 a.m.)
2003: WNYW-TV - Emmy Award, Winner, Evening Newscast (10 p.m.)
2003: WNYW-TV - Emmy Award, Nominee, Weather Reporting
2001: KCBS-TV - RTNA Golden Mic Award, "Winner, News Broadcast (11 p.m.)
2001: KCBS-TV - Emmy Award, Winner, Evening Newscast (6 p.m.)
1998: KCPQ-TV - Emmy Award, Winner, Weather Reporting
1996: WTXF-TV - Emmy Award, Nominee'', Weather Reporting

References

Living people
1967 births
Daytime Emmy Award winners
American television meteorologists
Television anchors from Seattle
Television anchors from Los Angeles
Television anchors from New York City
People from St. Louis
University of Missouri alumni
Scientists from New York (state)
Regional Emmy Award winners